Seafield is a small village in West Lothian, Scotland.

The village lies between the River Almond to the south and the M8 motorway to the north.

Seafield has many good community amenities such as a primary school, community centre, shop, hotel, bowling club and annual Gala day. It is also home to Cola P, creator of the Gobble. The band is currently defunct.

Situated just outside Seafield is Blackburn House. This is an A-listed building built in 1772 by George Moncrieff.

Seafield grew principally to provide housing for coal and oil-shale mine workers, with three poorer-quality rows north of the road demolished but two later, well-built terraces of miners' rows on the south side now restored in the centre of the village. The oil-shale works north of the village were cleared by the 1960s, leaving a large oil-shale bing (tip). The County Council then used the works site and the adjacent peat moss as its main domestic refuse tip until the 1980s. This generated serious water pollution problems, aggravated by outflow being east towards the New Town of Livingston. One of the last large-scale Scottish Enterprise-led land reclamation schemes, in the 1990s, utilised the spent shale (which is inert, having been retorted at high temperature) to blind over the tip, with full pollution control measures. 

Seafield Bing itself was remodelled to a design brief by West Lothian Planners, to resemble the natural basalt sills and lava flow landscapes of the Bathgate Hills and Fife, with a serrated crestline, and a proper summit now estimated at 198m asl in height, and renamed with approval of the Community Council "Seafield Law", appearing thus on latest Ordnance Survey maps. The wooded setting is a popular local recreational area.

References

External links

Museum of the Scottish shale oil industry - Seafield Rows

Villages in West Lothian
Mining communities in Scotland